Archie McComb was a member of the Wisconsin State Assembly.

Biography
McComb was born on January 22, 1885, in Fort Atkinson, Wisconsin. In 1910, he graduated from the University of Wisconsin Law School. He died in 1968.

Career
McComb was elected to the Assembly in 1912. He was a Republican.

References

People from Fort Atkinson, Wisconsin
Republican Party members of the Wisconsin State Assembly
Wisconsin lawyers
University of Wisconsin Law School alumni
1885 births
1968 deaths
20th-century American politicians
20th-century American lawyers